In Search of the Castaways is a novel by the French writer Jules Verne, published in 1867–68. The original edition, published by Hetzel, contains a number of illustrations by Édouard Riou. In 1876, it was republished by George Routledge & Sons as a three volume set titled A Voyage Round The World.  The three volumes were subtitled South America, Australia, and New Zealand. As often with Verne, English translations have appeared under different names; another edition has the overall title Captain Grant's Children and has two volumes subtitled The Mysterious Document and Among the Cannibals.

Plot summary
The book tells the story of the quest for Captain Grant of the Britannia. After finding a bottle the captain had cast into the ocean after the Britannia is shipwrecked, Lord and Lady Glenarvan of Scotland contact Mary and Robert, the young daughter and son of Captain Grant, through an announcement in a newspaper. The government refuses to launch a rescue expedition, but Lord and Lady Glenarvan, moved by the children's condition, decide to do it by themselves. The main difficulty is that the coordinates of the wreckage are mostly erased, and only the latitude (37 degrees) is known; thus, the expedition would have to circumnavigate the 37th parallel south. The bottle was retrieved from a shark's stomach, so it is impossible to trace its origin by the currents. Remaining clues consist of a few words in three languages. They are re-interpreted several times throughout the novel to make various destinations seem likely like Chile, Argentina, Southern Tip of Australia, at some times New Zealand and even the Northern Most Part of Antarctica (to which they never sailed).

Lord Glenarvan makes it his quest to find Grant; together with his wife, Grant's children and the crew of his yacht, the Duncan, they set off for South America. An unexpected passenger in the form of French geographer Jacques Paganel (he missed his steamer to India by accidentally boarding the Duncan) joins the search. They explore Patagonia, Tristan da Cunha Island, Amsterdam Island, and Australia (a pretext to describe the flora, fauna, and geography of numerous places to the audience).

There, they find a former quartermaster of the Britannia, Ayrton, who proposes to lead them to the site of the wreckage. However, Ayrton is a traitor, who was not present during the loss of the Britannia, but was abandoned in Australia after a failed attempt to seize control of the ship to practice piracy. He tries to take control of the Duncan, but by sheer luck, this attempt also fails. However the Glenarvans, the Grant children, Paganel and some sailors are left in Australia, and mistakenly believing that the Duncan is lost, they sail to Auckland, New Zealand, from where they want to come back to Europe. When their ship is wrecked south of Auckland on the New Zealand coast, they are captured by a Māori tribe, but luckily manage to escape and board a ship that they discover, to their astonishment, to be the Duncan.

Ayrton, made a prisoner, offers to trade his knowledge of Captain Grant in exchange for being abandoned on a desert island instead of being surrendered to the British authorities.  The Duncan sets sail for Tabor Island, which, by sheer luck, turns out to be Captain Grant's shelter. They leave Ayrton in his place to live among the beasts and regain his humanity.

Ayrton reappears in Verne's later novel, L'Île mystérieuse (The Mysterious Island, 1874).

Adaptations
 1877: Los sobrinos del capitán Grant ("Captain Grant's nephew and niece"), a three-act, spectacular Spanish zarzuela by Manuel Fernández Caballero to a text by Miguel Ramos Carrión.
1914: Les enfants du capitaine Grant, a French silent film and the last film Victorin-Hippolyte Jasset worked on before his untimely death.
 1936: The Children of Captain Grant (Дети капитана Гранта, Deti kapitana Granta), Soviet Union, directed by Vladimir Vajnshtok and starring Nikolai Cherkasov, film score composed by Isaak Dunayevsky. The film was released in the United States as Captain Grant's Children. (see ).
 1962: In Search of the Castaways, United States, a film directed by Robert Stevenson and starring Maurice Chevalier, Hayley Mills, and George Sanders. Songs by the Sherman Brothers were: "Castaway", "Enjoy It!", "Let's Climb", "Merci Beaucoup". (see ).
 1985: In Search of Captain Grant (В поисках капитана Гранта, V poiskakh kapitana Granta, Децата на капитан Грант), Bulgaria and the Soviet Union, a TV miniseries directed by Stanislav Govorukhin and starring Nikolai Yeryomenko, Jr., Lembit Ulfsak, Aleksandr Abdulov, Kosta Tsonev, and Anya Pencheva.

Maps

3 Maps Showing The Duncan's crew's search in Argentina,                    Chile, Australia and New Zealand.

References

External links

 
 
  
 
 177 illustrations by Édouard Riou from Les Enfants du capitaine Grant (1865–66)

1868 French novels
Castaways in fiction
French novels adapted into films
Novels adapted into operas
French novels adapted into television shows
Novels by Jules Verne
Novels set in Australia
Novels set in New Zealand
Novels set in South America
Novels set on ships